The 1945 Wilberforce Green Wave football team was an American football team that represented Wilberforce University in the Midwest Athletic Association (MAA) during the 1945 college football season. In its 10th season under head coach Gaston F. Lewis, the team compiled a 6–3 record and outscored opponents by a total of 177 to 85.

Schedule

References

Wilberforce State
Central State Marauders football seasons
Wilberforce State Green Wave football